The 2016 Pan American Men's Club Handball Championship was held in Villa Ballester, Buenos Aires 25–29 May. It acts as the Pan American qualifying tournament for the 2016 IHF Super Globe.

Participating teams
 River Plate
 SAG Villa Ballester
 Handebol Taubaté
 EC Pinheiros
 Club Italiano BM
 Salto del Guairá
 Colegio Alemán
 New York City Club

Preliminary round

Group A

Group B

Knockout stage

Bracket

5–8th place bracket

5–8th place semifinals

Semifinals

Seventh place game

Fifth place game

Third place game

Final

Final standing

Awards
All-star team
Goalkeeper:  Maik Santos
Right Wing:  Lucas Cândido
Right Back:  
Playmaker:  Julián Souto Cueto
Left Back:  Leonardo Dutra
Left Wing:  Adrian Portela
Pivot:  Vinícius Teixeira

References

External links
Official Web Site
Page of the championship on PATHF website

Pan American Men's Club Handball Championship
Pan American Men's Club Handball Championship
Pan American Men's Club Handball Championship
H
Sport in Buenos Aires Province